David Reid Syiemlieh (born 22 January 1953) is an Indian academician and the former Chairman of the Union Public Service Commission of India. He studied in Dr Graham's Homes, Kalimpong (1958–1970) and graduated with history honours from St.Edmund's College, Shillong. This was followed with a master's degree in History (1976), MPhil (1980) and PhD (1985) from the North Eastern Hill University, Shillong. He taught undergraduates in St. Edmund's College (1977–1979) before joining the Department of History, NEHU, in 1979. He rose in the profession to become a Professor in the Department of History. He held numerous positions in the University, including Dean of Students' Welfare; Head Department of History; Controller of Examinations; Registrar and Pro-Vice-Chancellor. Prof. Syiemlieh, is a former Vice-Chancellor, Rajiv Gandhi University, Doimukh, Arunachal Pradesh.

Career 
Author of several books and articles on the history of North East India, he is credited with discovering the date of death and other details of the last days of Tirot Sing, the Khasi chief of Nongkhlaw who resisted British colonial expansion and locating the grave in Calcutta of Thomas Jones, the Welsh missionary who first arrived in the Khasi Hills. David R Syiemlieh was Honorary Director of the Indian Council of Social Science Research, North Eastern Regional Centre, Shillong; Member of the Indian Council of Historical Research, New Delhi and Member, Indian Council of Social Science Research, New Delhi. The President of India appointed Prof. David R. Syiemlieh as Vice-Chancellor of Rajiv Gandhi University. He took charge on 5 October 2011.

Recognition 
He is a recipient of the Charles Wallace Grant for research in the UK; India France Cultural Exchange for research in Paris, and the Senior Fulbright Fellowship for research in the US. He was affiliated with Notre Dame University. Prof. Syiemlieh was President of the North East India History Association (2010–2011). As Sectional President- Modern India Section of the Indian History Congress, he delivered his address at the 73rd session held in Mumbai, 2012. Prof. David R. Syiemlieh was appointed by the President of India as Member, Union Public Service Commission, New Delhi.

He is married to Maxine Sohkhlet. They have two sons, Colin and Reuben.

References

David R. Syiemlieh, British Administration in Meghalaya: Policy and Pattern, Heritage Publishers, New Delhi, 1989.
David R. Syiemlieh, They Dared To Hope: The Holy Cross Congregation in India, Bangalore, 2000.
David R. Syiemlieh, Survey of Research in History on North East India 1970–1990, Regency Publishers, Shillong, 2000.
David R. Syiemlieh (ed.), Reflections from Shillong: Speeches of M. M. Jacob, Volume III Regency Publishers, N. Delhi, 2005.
David R. Syiemlieh (ed.), Diocese of Agartala: Ten Years and Onward, Bishop’s House, Agartala, 2006.
David R. Syiemlieh (ed.), with J. B. Bhattacharjee, Early States in North East India, Astral Publishers, New Delhi, 2013.
David R. Syiemlieh (ed.), On the Edge of Empire: Four British Plans for North East India, Sage India, New Delhi, 2014. (relist)
David R. Syiemlieh, Layers of History: Essays on the Khasi-Jaintias, Astral Publishers, New Delhi, 2015.

Living people
1953 births
20th-century Indian historians
North-Eastern Hill University alumni
Indian Christians
Chairmen of Union Public Service Commission